"Praying to a New God" is a single by English new wave band Wang Chung. Released in April 1989, the song peaked at No. 63 on the Billboard Hot 100 on 27 May. The official music video for the song was directed by Andy Morahan.

Charts

References

External links

1989 songs
1989 singles
Geffen Records singles
Music videos directed by Andy Morahan
Songs written by Nick Feldman
Songs written by Jack Hues
Wang Chung (band) songs